The 1933 San Francisco Dons football team was an American football team that represented the University of San Francisco as an independent during the 1933 college football season. In their second season under head coach Spud Lewis, the Dons compiled a 1–6–1 record and were outscored by a combined total of 74 to 42.

Schedule

References

San Francisco
San Francisco Dons football seasons
San Francisco Dons football